Khauk swè are wheat noodles in Burmese cuisines. Dishes made with them include:

Khauk swè thoke
Panthay khauk swè: Panthay-style fried noodles
Sigyet khaukswè: literally "noodles laced in cooked oil," usually with chicken

References

Burmese cuisine